Apollo Temple is a  summit located in the Grand Canyon, in Coconino County of northern Arizona, US. It is situated four miles due east of Cape Royal on the canyon's North Rim, four miles northeast of Vishnu Temple, and a half-mile south-southeast of Venus Temple, which is the nearest higher neighbor.

Apollo Temple is named for Apollo, god of the sun in Greek and Roman mythology. This name was applied in 1902 by geologist François E. Matthes, in keeping with Clarence Dutton's tradition of naming geographical features in the Grand Canyon after mythological deities. This feature's name was officially adopted in 1906 by the U.S. Board on Geographic Names.

The top of Apollo Temple is composed of lower strata of the Pennsylvanian-Permian Supai Group. This overlays the cliff-forming layer of Mississippian Redwall Limestone, which in turn overlays Cambrian Tonto Group. According to the Köppen climate classification system, Apollo Temple is located in a Cold semi-arid climate zone. Precipitation runoff from Apollo Temple drains south to the Colorado River via Unkar and Basalt Creeks.

See also
 Geology of the Grand Canyon area
 Grand Canyon Supergroup
 Venus Temple
 Ochoa Point

Gallery

References

External links 

 Weather forecast: National Weather Service
 1904 postcard (Apollo Temple to left): Wikimedia
 Aerial view, Apollo Temple, Mountainzone

Grand Canyon
Landforms of Coconino County, Arizona
Mountains of Arizona
Mountains of Coconino County, Arizona
Colorado Plateau
Grand Canyon National Park
North American 1000 m summits